Van Rhynsdorp (Afrikaans: Vanrhynsdorp) is a settlement in West Coast District Municipality in the Western Cape province of South Africa.

Van Rhynsdorp was founded as Trutro ("TroeTroe") after the area was first explored by Europeans in 1661 by Pieter van Meerhoff. The Troe-Troe Zending ("Mission") dates to the 1751 completion of the Trutro Homestead which is still standing at Van Rhynsdorp. The name of the town was changed to Van Rhynsdorp (in Afrikaans, Vanrhynsdorp) in 1881.

A significant proportion of Van Rhynsdorp's indigenous Khoe population are victims of alcoholism as a result of the European colonists “dop system” where historically the European colonists created apartheid to evict the indigenous Khoe from their own lands; European colonist farmers later paid their indigenous Khoe farm workers with alcohol and subsequent generations continued this cycle. The Khoe people are recognised, along with the San, as being the earliest residents of South Africa and are in fact the oldest people on Earth.

The town is located at the edge of the Nama Karoo, an area of semi-desert succulent vegetation. The mountains around the town were populated by the San people, a group of late stone age hunter-gatherers. Examples of rock art exist dating from this period exist in the area.

The Steenkampskraal rare earth mineral deposit lies 80 km to the north east of the town in nearby Namaqualand.

References

Populated places in the Matzikama Local Municipality
Populated places established in 1751
1751 establishments in the Dutch Empire